The George M. Carl was a lake freighter with 10,000 ton displacement.

History
She was launched in 1922 as the Fred Hartwell by the American Ship Building Company in Lorain, Ohio.
She was known as the Fred Hartwell until 1951, when she was renamed the Matthew Andrews.
She was renamed the George M. Carl in 1962, and was decommissioned in 1984.

She ran aground off the mouth of the Humber Bay on December 24, 1975.
The tugs William Rest, Lac Como, G.W. Rogers and the Bagotville were called upon to free her.
It required five days to free her.

References 

Merchant ships of Canada
Great Lakes freighters
1922 ships
Maritime incidents in 1975
Ships built in Lorain, Ohio